The 2020 FINA Women's Water Polo World League was the 17th edition of the annual women's international water polo tournament. It was played between October 2019 and June 2021 and opened to all women's water polo national teams. After participating in a preliminary round, eight teams qualified to play in a final tournament, called the Super Final, originally from 9–14 June 2020. The tournament was postponed due to the COVID-19 pandemic. In August 2020, it was announced that it would be played in from January to June 2021.

The United States won their seventh consecutive and 14th overall title, after defeating Hungary in the final.

In the world league, there are specific rules that do not allow matches to end in a draw. If teams are level at the end of the 4th quarter of any world league match, the match will be decided by a penalty shootout. The following points will be awarded per match to each team:

 Match won – 3 points
 Match won by penalty – 2 points
 Match lost by penalty – 1 point
 Match lost or forfeited – 0 points

European qualification round
 12 November 2019 – 27 March 2021

Inter-Continental Cup
 24 – 30 May 2021, Indianapolis, United States — cancelled

Super final

As host country
 

Qualified teams

Invited teams

Preliminary round
All times are local (UTC+3).

Group A

Group B

Knockout stage

Bracket

5–8th place bracket

Quarterfinals

5–8th place semifinals

Semifinals

Seventh place game

Fifth place game

Third place game

Final

Final ranking

Team Roster
Ashleigh Johnson, Maddie Musselman, Melissa Seidemann, Rachel Fattal, Paige Hauschild, Maggie Steffens (C), Stephania Haralabidis, Jamie Neushul, Jordan Raney, Aria Fischer, Kaleigh Gilchrist, Makenzie Fischer, Alys Williams, Amanda Longan. Head coach: Adam Krikorian.

Awards
The awards were announced on 19 June 2021.

References

External links

Super final – Results book

FINA Women's Water Polo World League
W
W
W
Water polo